Wessenden Head Reservoir is the highest in a series of four reservoirs in the Wessenden Valley above the village of Marsden in West Yorkshire, at the northern end of the Peak District National Park.

Following the Wessenden Act of Parliament of 1836, Wessenden Reservoir was created by the construction of an earth embankment across Wessenden Brook. The Huddersfield Waterworks and Improvements Act of 1876 approved the building of a new reservoir above Wessenden Reservoir. Wessenden Head Reservoir was built between 1877 and 1881, fed from a catchwater drain via a sluice in the Shiny Brook (a tributary of Wessenden Brook). The Huddersfield Waterworks Act of 1890 led to Huddersfield Corporation purchasing the reservoirs from the Wessenden Commissioners in order to supply drinking water to the town.

The reservoir is currently owned and operated by Yorkshire Water.

The Wessenden Valley Woodland Project was initiated in 2017 to develop natural habitats with increased biodiversity.

The Pennine Way long-distance footpath runs along the northern side of the reservoir and its dam.

See also 

 Yorkshire Water Way

References 

Reservoirs of the Peak District
Reservoirs in Yorkshire